Matthias Hofbauer (born 22 May 1981) is a Swiss professional floorball forward currently playing for the SV Wiler-Ersigen of the Nationalliga A (NLA).

His younger brother Christoph is floorball player.

International play
Hofbauer has represented his country 45 times. He played his first game for the national team in 2000. At the 2004 World Championships, where Switzerland loss in the bronze medal game, Hofbauer was named best forward and a member of the all-star team; he was the tournament's leading scorer.

Career statistics

International

References

1981 births
Living people
Floorball players
Swiss sportsmen